The bellystriped blaasop (Arothron inconditus) is a species of pufferfish that grows up to 40 cm and lives in South Africa.

Distribution and habitat 
A. inconditus lives in waters from 1 to 20 meters deep. It is native to South Africa, living in subtropical environments, in sandstone tide pools, beaches, and river mouths.

Ecology 
It is a colonial sessile insectivore. The juveniles of this species are 36–65 mm in length. It is an oviparous fish.

Conservation 
It occurs in at least one marine protected area, yet it still has threats elsewhere, including pollution, climate change, residential development, and commercial development, so it is listed as Vulnerable by the IUCN Red List.

References 

Fish described in 1958
Marine fish of Africa
Tetraodontidae
Fish of South Africa